Kočani orkestar (in Macedonian: Кочани оркестар) also credited under the names: Kocani orkestar, Kocani Orchestra, Kochani orkestar and Kochani Orchestra is a Macedonian Romani brass band from Kočani, North Macedonia led till 2000 by Naat Veliov. 
Kočani orkestar are among the funkiest exponents of the Balkan brass band style which is found across ex-Yugoslavia and is a direct descendant of the music once played by Turkish army bands. Their music is based on Gypsy tunes from various parts of the Balkans and on Turkish rhythms, with a sprinkle of Latin flavour.

Their song "Siki, siki baba" is featured on the soundtrack for the movie Borat: Cultural Learnings of America for Make Benefit Glorious Nation of Kazakhstan although it has no connection to the Music of Kazakhstan. Together with the Romani singer Esma Redžepova, Naat Veliov has filed a lawsuit for the producers of the movie for an unauthorised use of the song.

Discography
Albums
 A Gypsy Brass Band (1995)
 L'Orient Est Rouge (1998)
 Gypsy Mambo (1999)
 Ulixes (2001) with the Harmonia Ensemble
 Alone At My Wedding (2002)
 The Ravished Bride (2008)

Contributing artist
The Rough Guide to the Music of Eastern Europe (1999, World Music Network)

Members

Vocals
Ajnur Azizov -  in Macedonian, Turkish and Roma
Percussion
Saban Jasarov
Tuba
Redzai Durmisev
Nijazi Alimov
Sukri Zejnelov
Suad Asanov
Saxophone
Durak Demirov
Trumpet
Turan Gaberov
Sukri Kadriev
Clarinet
Dzeladin Demirov
Accordion
Vinko Stefanov

See also
 Balkan Music
 Esma Redžepova
 Romani music
 Romani people
 Music of North Macedonia

References

External links
 Koçani Orkestar pages on the Crammed Discs label site
 Divano Production
 Kočani Orkestar Myspace page

Kočani
Macedonian musical groups
Macedonian musicians
Romani in North Macedonia